The 2002 Hull City Council election took place on 2 May 2002 to elect members of Hull City Council in England. The whole council was up for election with boundary changes since the last election in 2000 reducing the number of seats by 1. The Labour Party lost overall control of the council to no overall control.

Campaign
Hull was seen as one of the key contests in the 2002 local elections with the Liberal Democrats seen as the main challengers to Labour. Labour had run Hull continuously since 1945, apart from a brief period from 1969 to 1971 when the Conservatives had taken control, but they were seen as vulnerable in this election. As well as the Liberal Democrats, who with 10 seats were the main opposition before the election, the Conservatives stood in 31 of the 59 seats that were being contested. Divisions within the local Labour party also meant some councillors stood in the election as independents.

The Labour administration received criticism from the opposition and by the district auditor for the poor quality of services provided in Hull. The opposition also attacked Labour for their use of the £255 million recently gained by Hull council after the part sale of Kingston Communications.

Election result

The results saw the Liberal Democrats become the largest party on the council with Labour falling from 44 seats before the election to only 24 afterwards.

Ward results

References

2002
2002 English local elections
2000s in Kingston upon Hull